ispace Inc. is a private Japanese company developing robotic spacecraft technologies to build landers and rovers to compete for both transportation and exploration mission contracts from space agencies and private industry. ispace will enable clients who may want to discover, map, and use the natural lunar resources.

From 2013 to 2018, ispace was the owner and operator of the Hakuto team that competed in Google Lunar X Prize (GLXP). The team developed a lunar rover named Sorato.

ispace is currently headquartered in Tokyo, Japan, with offices in the United States and Luxembourg. The company's founder and CEO is Takeshi Hakamada.

History 

Although ispace is now independent, it began as a partner of a European organization called White Label Space. White Label Space (WLS) was an international team of space engineers that was founded in 2008 to compete in the Google Lunar X Prize, for a grand prize of US$20 million to send a spacecraft to the Moon's surface, and have it travel 500 meters. WLS was headquartered in the Netherlands and led by Steve Allen. The European side aimed to develop the team's lunar lander while the Japanese group consisting of Tohoku University Space Robotics Lab and led by Kazuya Yoshida was to develop a rover.

In 2010, White Label Space Japan LLC, the predecessor of ispace was founded by Takeshi Hakamada to manage the commercial and technical aspect of the Japanese group. On 30 January 2013, when the European teammates ceased substantial involvement in the prize, the Japan-based members decided to continue the work, and WLS transferred the GLXP participation right to White Label Space Japan LLC. Steve Allen, WLS's leader was succeeded by Takeshi Hakamada.

In May 2013, the team's parent company, White Label Space Japan changed its name to ispace, while the GLXP team was renamed "Hakuto" on 15 July of the same year. Team Hakuto did not succeed in undertaking a lunar mission during the GLXP, but following the cessation of the competition, ispace continued its lunar exploration plans and, in 2018, the company succeeded in raising over US$90 million in private funding to develop its own lunar lander in addition to continuing its work on lunar rovers.

By September 2018, ispace planned to test their systems by orbiting around the Moon but not land on it. The company signed up for two launches on SpaceX's Falcon 9 rockets, to take place in 2020 and 2021. ispace is also developing a mission concept called Polar Ice Explorer that would prospect for lunar resources on a region near the lunar south pole.

On 10 October 2018, an industry team formed by Draper Laboratory, along with ispace, General Atomics, and Spaceflight Industries submitted a proposal for a commercial lunar lander to NASA's Commercial Lunar Payload Services Program. According to Draper, ispace will serve as the team's design agent.

On 21 July 2022, NASA announced that it had awarded a CLPS contract to Draper Laboratories and the team.

Hakuto-R program 
The long-term strategy of ispace is to build landers and rovers to compete for both transportation and exploration mission contracts from space agencies and private industry. NASA aims at contracting private industries to scout and mine lunar water and other lunar resources to support a future Moon-based infrastructure. The funding for the first two missions was originally secured from a consortium of Japanese funds and companies.

In 2018, ispace signed a working agreement with Draper to serve as the team's design agent, which brought about significant changes. In August 2019, ispace announced a restructuring of its lunar program, now called Hakuto-R, in light of rapid increases in customer demand for payload delivery services in the lunar exploration industry, especially from the recent Commercial Lunar Payload Services (CLPS) contract awarded to Draper and its partners, including ispace. A significant change was the elimination of the technology demonstration orbiter mission in 2020 in favor of moving more quickly toward a demonstration of landing capabilities. Hakuto-R Mission 1 is a lunar lander carrying the Emirates Lunar Mission rover Rashid in a partnership with the Mohammed bin Rashid Space Centre (MBRSC), along with Tomy and JAXA's SORA-Q transformable lunar robot. Hakuto-R Mission 1 houses another payload, that is, a music disc featuring the song ‘SORATO’ by the Japanese rock band Sakanaction. The song was initially released in 2018 as a part of the Team Hakuto campaign for the Google Lunar XPRIZE.

Launches
Hakuto-R Mission 1 was launched on 11 December 2022 at 07:38 UTC on a Falcon 9 Block 5 rocket, along with Emirates Lunar Mission and NASA's Lunar Flashlight spacecraft. The mission is expected to enter lunar orbit in late March 2023 with a lunar landing attempt scheduled for late April 2023.

Hakuto-R Mission 2, a lunar lander and rover, is scheduled for launch in 2024.

Mission 3 and beyond 
ispace Mission 3 is expected to launch in 2025. Missions 3 through 9 aim to establish ispace's lunar lander as a high-frequency cost-effective transportation system, while Mission 10 and beyond will begin the construction of an "industrial platform" to enable the development of lunar water resources.

See also 

 Artemis-7, lander designed by ispace
 Colonization of the Moon
 Hakuto
 Luna-27
 Lunar resources
 Lunar water
 Moon Express, a similar company aiming to mine the Moon
 Private spaceflight
 SELENE-R, potential application of ispace instruments

References

External links 
 
 White Label Space Japan 

Companies based in Tokyo
Private spaceflight companies
Spacecraft manufacturers
Google Lunar X Prize
Robotics companies of Japan
Japanese brands
Aerospace companies of Japan